Aerenicopsis pugnatrix is a species of beetle in the family Cerambycidae. It was described by Lane in 1966.

References

Aerenicini
Beetles described in 1966